The Blue Moon Boys were an American rock and roll band that was formed by Elvis Presley, lead guitarist Scotty Moore and double bass player Bill Black. The group members were introduced by Sun Studio owner Sam Phillips in 1954, except for D.J. Fontana, who joined the group during a Louisiana Hayride tour in 1955. The Blue Moon Boys were inducted into the Musicians Hall of Fame and Museum in 2007. The band was named after Bill Monroe's song "Blue Moon of Kentucky".

Background 
On July 18, 1953, Elvis Presley recorded a single at  Sun Studio as a gift for his mother's birthday, the Ink Spots' "My Happiness", with "That's When Your Heartaches Begin" on the flipside.
Studio owner Sam Phillips was not there, so Presley's recording was managed by his secretary, Marion Keisker, who kept a demo copy of the recording.

At Phillips' behest Keisker called Presley for an appointment at the studio almost a year later; he returned on June 26, 1954. Although most of the session was not recorded, Phillips was impressed by Presley and introduced him to the country music band Starlight Wranglers' guitarist Scotty Moore, who later introduced Presley to double bass player Bill Black.

Sun recordings 
On July 5, 1954, the trio headed to the Sun Studios for a recording test together. They recorded the songs "Harbor Lights" and "I Love You Because", and during a break they performed an impromptu version of Arthur Crudup's "That's All Right", which impressed Phillips, who asked for a refinement of the interpretation that later was recorded. 
Phillips played the recording for WHBQ's DJ Dewey Phillips, who played the song on his regular show next night, on July 8.
On July 9, the trio recorded what became the flipside to "That's All Right", an uptempo rockabilly version of Bill Monroe's "Blue Moon of Kentucky".  
The single was released on July 19, 1954, and was a local hit in Arkansas, Mississippi and New Orleans.

Live appearances 

Scotty Moore became the manager of the band, and they toured several cities in the south, the three members still working at their regular employments when not touring. Both Moore and Black focused more on the group after they let Presley perform at the regular Starlight Wranglers show on the Bon Air club, where the reception of the audience was unfavorable, and led to animosity between them and the other members of the group for having to leave the stage.
The Blue Moon Boys appeared on a regular basis at Eagle's Nest club in Memphis, Tennessee. Sam Phillips booked the band an appearance at the Grand Ole Opry, which was not well received.
After the failure, Phillips contacted Opry's main competition, the Louisiana Hayride. They made their first appearance on October 16, 1954. Presley sang "That's All Right" followed by the flipside of the record, "Blue Moon of Kentucky". The performance was well received and they signed a one-year contract to be official members of the Hayride, while Presley also signed a new management contract with Bob Neal. 
On August 8, D.J. Fontana joined the band as the drummer on a regular basis after having played occasionally with them, the first time in Shreveport and subsequently on tour.
After disputes with Hank Snow's manager, Tom Parker, who booked most of Presley's appearances, Bob Neal turned over the contract to Colonel Parker who became officially Presley's manager on December 15, 1955.

RCA Victor and later years 
In January 1956, Presley signed a $40,000  contract with RCA Victor, recording for the first time on January 10, 1956, Mae Axton's "Heartbreak Hotel". The Blue Moon Boys continued appearing on Presley's recordings as well as in movies like Loving You. The first live appearance of the band since Presley's army return was in 1960, during The Frank Sinatra Show's special Welcome Home Elvis —minus Bill Black, who had left The Blue Moon Boys in 1958. The band's last appearance was during the Elvis 1968 Comeback Specialdedicated to the memory of Bill Black, who had died on October 21, 1965 of a brain tumor. In 2007, the Blue Moon Boys were inducted into the Musicians Hall of Fame and Museum in Nashville.

Members 
 Elvis Presley – lead vocals, rhythm guitar, piano, lead guitar, percussion, bass guitar (1954–1968; died August 16, 1977)
 Scotty Moore – lead guitar, rhythm guitar, backing vocals (1954–1968; died June 28, 2016)
 Bill Black – double bass, bass guitar, backing vocals (1954–1958; died October 21, 1965)
 D. J. Fontana – drums, percussion, backing vocals (1955–1968; died June 13, 2018)

Timeline

Sources

Sun Records artists
Elvis Presley
Rockabilly music groups
Musical groups established in 1954
American rockabilly musicians